Zhang Chu may refer to:

 Dazexiang uprising, which proclaimed the Zhang Chu kingdom
 Da Chu or Zhang Chu, puppet dynasty under Zhang Bangchang
 Zhang Chu (singer), Chinese singer